Peraphyllum is a monotypic genus of flowering plants in the rose family, containing the single species Peraphyllum ramosissimum, commonly known as the squaw apple or wild crab apple.

Translated from the Greek, the genus Peraphyllum means "very leafy" and the species name ramosissimum means "many branches".  Peraphyllum is most closely related to Amelanchier, Malacomeles, Crataegus, and Mespilus.

Distribution
Peraphyllum ramosissimum grows in California, Oregon, Idaho, Utah, Colorado, and New Mexico usually in pine and juniper woodlands.  In California it can be found in the High Cascades, High Sierra Nevada, Great Basin, and Mojave Desert sky islands.

Description
The leaves are simple; they can grow very close together on short shoots but are well separated on longer shoots.

Like most other flowering plants of the Rosaceae, Peraphyllum ramosissimum has 5 petals and 5 sepals with radial symmetry. The flowers have about 15-20 free stamens, the petals are white to rose in color.

References

External links

Jepson Manual Treatment: Peraphyllum ramosissimum
USDA PLANTS entry for Peraphyllum ramosissimum (wild crab apple)
Peraphyllum ramosissimum — U.C. Photo gallery

Maleae
Monotypic Rosaceae genera
Flora of California
Flora of Nevada
Flora of Oregon
Flora of Idaho
Flora of Utah
Flora of Colorado
Flora of New Mexico
Flora of the Great Basin
Flora of the Sierra Nevada (United States)
Flora without expected TNC conservation status